The 2020–21 NC State Wolfpack women's basketball team represented North Carolina State University during the 2020–21 NCAA Division I women's basketball season. The Wolfpack were led by eighth year head coach Wes Moore and played their home games at Reynolds Coliseum as members of the Atlantic Coast Conference.

The Wolfpack finished the season 22–3 and 12–2 in ACC play to finish in second place.  They won the ACC tournament defeating Virginia Tech, Georgia Tech, and Louisville along the way to their title.  It was NC State's sixth title in school history.  As ACC Tournament Champions, they received an automatic bid to the NCAA tournament where they were the one seed in the Mercado Regional.  In the tournament they defeated sixteen seed  in the First Round and eight seed South Florida before losing to four seed Indiana in the Sweet Sixteen to end their season.

Previous season
They finished the 2019–20 season 27–4, 14–4 in ACC play to finish in second place. They advanced to the finals of the ACC women's tournament where they defeated Florida State to win the ACC Tournament for the first time since 1991. As winners of the conference tournament, the Wolfpack received the automatic bid to the 2020 NCAA Division I women's basketball tournament, however, due to the COVID-19 pandemic, the NCAA Tournament was canceled on March 12, 2020.

Off-season

Departures

Incoming transfers

Recruiting Class

Source:

Roster

Schedule

Source

|-
!colspan=9 style="background:#E00000; color:white;"| Non-conference regular season

|-
!colspan=9 style="background:#E00000; color:white;"| ACC regular season

|-
!colspan=9 style="background:#E00000; color:white;"| ACC Tournament

|-
!colspan=9 style="background:#E00000; color:white;"| NCAA tournament

Rankings

Coaches did not release a Week 2 poll and AP does not release a final poll.

References

NC State Wolfpack women's basketball seasons
NC State
NC State